Radu Doicaru (born 26 February 1979) is a Romanian former football player who currently is a manager at youth level.

External links 
 
 

1979 births
Living people
People from Mangalia
Romanian footballers
Association football forwards
Liga I players
Liga II players
FCV Farul Constanța players
CSM Ceahlăul Piatra Neamț players